Ngāti Apa ki te Rā Tō is a Māori iwi (tribe) in the upper South Island of New Zealand. Its rohe (tribal lands) include the areas around Golden Bay, Tākaka, Tasman Bay / Te Tai-o-Aorere, Motueka, Nelson and Saint Arnaud, including Taitapu and Kawatiri River catchments and Lakes Rotoiti, Rotoroa, and the Tophouse.

Hapū and marae

Ngāti Apa ki te Rā Tō has two hapū with affiliated marae:
 Pūaha Te Rangi (Te Taha o Te Awa marae and Te Taha o te Awa wharenui, Westport)
 Tarakaipa (Ōmaka marae and Te Aroha o te Waipounamu wharenui, Blenheim)

Governance

Ngāti Apa ki Te Rā Tō Charitable Trust is the mandated iwi organisation under the Māori Fisheries Act, the iwi aquaculture organisation under the Māori Commercial Aquaculture Claims Settlement Act, is a Tūhono organisation, and is an "iwi authority" under the Resource Management Act 1991. Ngāti Apa ki Te Rā Tō Trust is recognised by the New Zealand Government as the Ngāti Apa ki te Rā Tō governance entity, following its settlement with the Crown under the Ngāti Apa ki te Rā Tō, Ngāti Kuia, and Rangitāne o Wairau Claims Settlement Act 2014. It also represents Ngāti Apa ki te Rā Tō as an iwi authority under the Resource Management Act. The trust is a common law trust governed by six trustees. Both trusts are governed by six trustees: three from Puaha Te Rangi hapū and three from Tarakaipa hapū.

As of 2021, the trust chairperson is Hinemoa Conner, the General Manager is Simon Karipa, and the trust is primarily based in Blenheim and has a second office in Nelson.

The iwi has interests in the territories of Tasman District Council, Nelson City Council, Marlborough District Council, the West Coast Regional Council and Buller District Council.

Notable people

 Joanne Baxter – public health academic
 Jackson Hemopo – rugby union player
 Tuiti Makitanara – politician
 Fayne Robinson – master carver

References

 
Tasman District
Nelson, New Zealand
Marlborough Region
Buller District
Iwi and hapū